The 2022 Youngstown State Penguins football team represented Youngstown State University as a member of the Missouri Valley Football Conference (MVFC) during the 2022 NCAA Division I FCS football season. Led by third-year head coach Doug Phillips, the Penguins played their home games at Stambaugh Stadium in Youngstown, Ohio.

Previous season

The Penguins finished the 2021 season with a record of 3–7, 2–6 MVFC play to finish in a 3-way tie for last place.

Schedule

Game summaries

Duquesne

Dayton

at No. 9 (FBS) Kentucky

at No. 1 North Dakota State

No. 22 North Dakota

Indiana State

at Western Illinois

South Dakota

at Illinois State

at Missouri State

Southern Illinois

References

Youngstown State
Youngstown State Penguins football seasons
Youngstown State Penguins football